Gargari or Gorgori or Gargiri may refer to:
 Gargari-ye Olya
 Gargari-ye Sofla